Nickola Shreli is an American actor, producer, and writer. He has appeared in Abduction, Low Winter Sun, Hostel: Part III, and Cash Only, which he also wrote and produced.

Biography

Nickola Shreli was born in Detroit, Michigan, to an Albanian family that immigrated to the United States. He attended Eisenhower High School's theater program. He worked on smaller projects in Detroit's underground independent film scene and did production on larger projects, such as 8mile, that came to town. In 2010, he won an audition for Abduction, and John Singleton cast him as a lead villain in the role of "Alec". Shreli wrote, produced, and starred in Cash Only, which was released in the United States in May 2016 after premiering at the 2015 Fantasia International Film Festival.

Charity

Since 2007 Nickola Shreli has been involved with both the World Vision (Christian humanitarian organization) Vlore Area Project in Albania as well as Mother Teresa's Missionaries of Charity Branch in Detroit.
He currently sponsors numerous troubled children in the region & continues to bring awareness to both causes.

Filmography

References

External links

Living people
American male television actors
American male film actors
American people of Albanian descent
Year of birth missing (living people)